The Granitnaya (formerly Ушагоу Ushagou, literally "Hubutu River"), is a river located on the border between Primorsky Krai of Far Eastern Russia and the Heilongjiang province of China (northeast). It is a right tributary of the Razdolnaya.

References 

Rivers of Heilongjiang
Rivers of Primorsky Krai
Drainage basins of the Sea of Japan